Ivan Jevtić (born April 29, 1947 in Belgrade, Serbia, then Yugoslavia) is a Serbian/French composer and member of the Serbian Academy of Sciences and Arts. He is a former student of Stanojlo Rajičić, Alfred Uhl and Olivier Messiaen.

References

External links
Official website
Biography at the website of the Serbian Academy of Sciences and Arts
Official website of the Serbian Academy of Sciences and Arts
Ivan Jevtić's discography at Fnac.com

1947 births
Living people
Serbian composers
French composers
French male composers
Members of the Serbian Academy of Sciences and Arts